Gunja (Neung-dong) Station is a station on Line 5 and Line 7 of the Seoul Subway in Gwangjin-gu, Seoul.

Station layout

Line 5

Line 7

References

Railway stations opened in 1995
Metro stations in Gwangjin District
Seoul Metropolitan Subway stations